O'Reilly is a rural locality in the Scenic Rim Region, Queensland, Australia. It borders New South Wales.

Geography 
O'Reilly is located on Queensland's border with New South Wales on the elevated Lamington Plateau. The plateau remains heavily vegetated by Gondwana Rainforests.

Almost the whole of the locality is within the Lamington National Park, except for the Boonyong pastoral property and the O'Reilly's Rainforest Retreat mountain resort.

The Lamington National Park contains a network of walking tracks, lookouts and numerous waterfalls.

History 

Education 
There are no schools in O'Reilly. The nearest primary school is Canungra State School in Canungra. The nearest secondary school is Tamborine Mountain State High School in Tamborine Mountain.

References 

Scenic Rim Region
Localities in Queensland